HMS Jed was a Thornycroft type River-class destroyer ordered by the Royal Navy under the 1903 – 1904 Naval Estimates.  Named after the River Jed in southern Scotland, she was the second ship to carry this name since it was introduced in 1814 for a 26-gun sixth rate ship sold in 1833.

Construction
She was laid down on 27 February 1903 at the Thornycroft shipyard at Chiswick and launched on 13 February 1904.  She was completed on 10 January 1905.  Her original armament was to be the same as the Turleback torpedo boat destroyers that preceded her.  In 1906 the Admiralty decided to upgrade the armament by landing the five 6-pounder naval guns and shipping three 12-pounder 8 hundredweight (cwt) guns.  Two would be mounted abeam at the foc'x'le break and the third gun would be mounted on the quarterdeck.

Pre-War
After commissioning she was assigned to the East Coast Destroyer Flotilla of the 1st Fleet and based at Harwich.

On 27 April 1908 the Eastern Flotilla departed Harwich for live fire and night manoeuvres.  During these exercises  rammed and sank  then damaged .

In 1909/1910 she was assigned to the China Station.

On 30 August 1912 the Admiralty directed all destroyer classes were to be designated by alpha characters starting with the letter 'A'.  The ships of the River Class were assigned to the E Class.  After 30 September 1913, she was known as an E Class destroyer and had the letter ‘E’ painted on the hull below the bridge area and on either the fore or aft funnel.

First World War
She deployed with the China Squadron to Tsingtao to blockade the German base. On 24 November 1914, after the Japanese declaration of war, she returned to Hong Kong.

Upon the arrival of the transports on 16 April, the three ships pursued the Turkish torpedo boat Demir Hissar, which was attacking the transport SS Manitou at Tribouki. The Turkish torpedo boat was driven ashore and destroyed. They shared the prize monies awarded.

On 25 April 1915, she supported the landings at ANZAC Cove as part of the 3rd Division’s feint attack on Bulair.

In May 1915, she was stationed in the Gulf of Xeros to act as a wireless relay for submarines operating in the Dardanelles, principally .

December 1915 found her on the Smyrna Patrol, enforcing the blockade of the Turkish coast from Cape Kaba to latitude 38o30’E, 200 nautical miles including Smyrna.  At this time, she was based at Port Iero on the island of Mytelene.

From 1 to 7 January 1916, she participated in the roundup of enemy agents in Mytelene.

She remained in the Mediterranean until the end of the war.

Disposition
In 1919 she returned to Home waters, was paid off and laid up in reserve awaiting disposal.  On 30 June 1920 she was sold to Thos. W. Ward of Sheffield for breaking at Preston, Lancashire.

She was awarded the Battle Honour Dardanelles 1915 - 1916 for her service.

Pennant Numbers
It is not known if she was assigned a pennant number as no record has been found.

References

Bibliography
 
 
 
 
 
 
 

 

River-class destroyers
World War I destroyers of the United Kingdom
1904 ships
Ships built by John I. Thornycroft & Company